Hypericum aphyllum is an annual herb in the genus Hypericum. It is 0.4-0.65 meters tall. They have only been found in the area around Toledo District, Belize.

References

aphyllum
Flora of Belize